Crystal Lake is a lake in Polk County, in the U.S. state of Minnesota.

Crystal Lake was so named on account of its clear water.

See also
List of lakes in Minnesota

References

Lakes of Minnesota
Lakes of Polk County, Minnesota